The Taiwan Action Party Alliance (TAPA) was a political party in Taiwan established on 18 August 2019 and dissolved on 19 January 2020.

Founding
In July 2019, Chen Shui-bian stated on Facebook that he was "pleased to see the birth of a new political party, the ‘One Country on One Side Action Party." This was a literal translation of the party's Chinese name, which derives from the One Country on Each Side concept developed by Chen when he served as President of the Republic of China. The party chairmanship was reportedly offered to Yu Shyi-kun, who declined the position. The Taiwan Action Party Alliance's founding assembly was held at National Taiwan University Alumni Hall on 18 August 2019. At the founding assembly, Yang Chyi-wen was elected the inaugural party chairman, and took office alongside a 15-member executive council.

Membership
Among TAPA's 152 founding members were a number of medical professionals. Several members in attendance at the party's founding assembly expressed disappointment in the Tsai Ing-wen presidential administration as reason for them to join TAPA. The party charter emphasized Taiwan independence, in contrast to Tsai's status quo Cross-Strait relations policy.

2020 elections
Taiwan Action Party Alliance officials stated that the party would not nominate a candidate for the 2020 Taiwan presidential election, but would contest the 2020 Taiwan legislative election. TAPA did not win any legislative seats in the 2020 elections.

The party was dissolved on 19 January 2020.

Notes

References

External links
 

Political parties established in 2019
2019 establishments in Taiwan
2020 disestablishments in Taiwan
Secessionist organizations in Asia
Defunct political parties in Taiwan
Taiwan independence movement
Pro-independence parties
Political parties disestablished in 2020